The Port of Cernavodă, in the city of Cernavodă on the Danube River, is one of the largest Romanian river ports.

References

Ports and harbours of Romania